The SheBelieves Cup is an invitational women's Football tournament held in different cities in the United States in late February or early March. In its first three years (2016, 2017, and 2018), it was contested by the same four teams: the United States, England, France, and Germany. Since 2019, the tournament lineup has featured different teams each year.

The SheBelieves cup is played at the same time of year as the Algarve Cup, the Arnold Clark Cup, the 
Cup of Nations, the Cyprus Women's Cup, the Istria Cup, the Pinatar Cup, the Tournoi de France, the Turkish Women's Cup and the Women's Revelations Cup.

History
The SheBelieves movement was inspired by the U.S. national team in their 2015 run-up to the World Cup. The movement is meant to encourage young women to achieve their dreams, regardless of whether or not they are tied to athletics. As part of regular society, SheBelieves is dedicated to women's empowerment. This theme of empowerment has evolved into a bond between U.S. soccer and its fans, as the team has spread this message to communities across the country. United States Soccer serves as SheBelieves Ambassadors, launching a new program to unite and elevate nonprofits, women's sports organizations, and influencers with the shared goal of positively impacting girls and women.

SheBelieves Summit 
The SheBelieves Summit, which took place virtually in 2021, is a major component of programming around the tournament itself. Its purpose is to empower young women and girls using the three core pillars of SheBelieves: confidence, career, and community. The summit includes panels, fireside chats, and breakout sessions designed to provide event attendees with hands-on experience and tools for success. Event programming features various female speakers, from women in STEM to professional athletes.

In its third year, some notable speakers for the 2021 event included:

 Abby Wambach
 Sage Steele
 Cindy Parlow Cone
 Tierna Davidson
 Danielle Slaton
 Cathy Engelbert

Tournament format
The four invited teams play in a round-robin tournament. Points awarded in the group stage followed the formula of three points for a win, one point for a draw, and zero points for a loss. A tie in points would be decided by goal differential; other tie-breakers are used as needed in the following order: goal difference, goals scored, head-to-head result, and a fair play score based on the number of yellow and red cards.

Results

Medals

Participating nations

Summary

Best player

Top goalscorers

References

External links
Official website, USSoccer.com 

 
International women's association football competitions hosted by the United States
International women's association football invitational tournaments
Recurring sporting events established in 2016
2016 establishments in the United States
February sporting events